Nuck may refer to:

People
 Anton Nuck (1650–1692), Dutch physician
 Robert Nuck (born 1983), German sprint canoeist
 nickname of Enoch Brown (American football) (1892–1962), American college football player and Rhodes Scholar
 nickname of Enoch L. Johnson (1883–1968), American politician and racketeer during Prohibition
 nickname of Chris Nilan (born 1958), American former National Hockey League player and former radio host

Fictional characters
 Nucky Thompson, also nicknamed Nuck, in the television series Boardwalk Empire

See also
 Nucks, a nickname of the Vancouver Canucks National Hockey League team
 Nuuk, the capital of Greenland
 Nuk (disambiguation)
 Nuq (disambiguation)
 Nuc (disambiguation)

Lists of people by nickname